Arkadiusz Mularczyk 

•	Born 4/2/1971 in Racibórz, Poland

•	Graduated with a Masters in Law from the Jagiellonian University, Kraków in 1996.

•	Local councillor in Nowy Sacz from 1992-2002.

•	Postgraduate studies at the Helsinki Foundation of Human Rights in Warsaw in 2000.

•	Qualified to the bar in 2001, and worked as an Attorney-at-law until 2005.

•	Elected as an MP in 2005, and is currently serving his 5th term of office.

•	Delegate to the Council of Europe since 2011

•	Represented the Polish parliament in front of the Constitutional Tribunal 

On November 22, 2019, he was elected by the Sejm to the National Council of the Judiciary. In October 2020, he was elected by the NCJ as its vice-chairman. In the same year, he also became the chairman of the delegation of the Polish Parliament to the Parliamentary Assembly of the Council of Europe, and in 2021 he became the vice-chairman of the Parliamentary Assembly of the Council of Europe and the secretary of State Ministry of Foreign Affairs.

Political biography 
Members of Polish Sejm 2005-2007

Positions held in office:

Poland’s 5th Parliament 2005-2007 

•	Chairman of the Sub-Committee on Amendments to the Code of Penal Procedure 

•	Vice-Chairman of the Justice and Human Rights Committee 

•	Vice-Chairman of the Codification Committee

•	Member of the Legislative Committee 

•	Member of the Sub-Committee on the Constitutional Tribunal

•	Co-drafted the Lustration Act with now-President, Andrzej Duda

Poland’s 6th Parliament 2007-2011

•	Vice-Chairman of the Justice and Human Rights Committee

•	Vice-Chairman of the Legislative Committee

•	Participated in the Investigation Committee looking at illegal political influence on the judiciary and Polish secret service

Poland’s 7th Parliament 2011-2015

•	Chairman of the parliamentary party

•	Vice-Chairman of the Committee for Constitutional Responsibility

•	Member of the Polish delegation to the Council of Europe

•	Member of the Committee for Foreign Affairs 

Poland’s 8th Parliament 2015-2019

•	Chairman for the newly-established parliamentary Committee for War Reparations 

•	Chairman of the Extraordinary Committee for Amending Codification 

•	Chairman of the Permanent Subcommittee for Amendments to Civil Law
 
•	Member of the Legislative Committee 

•	Member of the Committee for Foreign Affairs

•	Member of the Council of Europe Committee on the Election of Judges to the ECHR

Poland’s 9th Parliament 2019 onwards

•	Leader of the Polish delegation to the Council of Europe

•	Vice-Chairman of the National Council of the Judiciary of Poland

•	Vice-Chairman of the Foreign Affairs Committee

•	Vice-Chairman of the Legislative Committee

•	Member of the Council of Europe Committee on Legal Affairs and Human Rights 

•	Member of the Regulations, Deputies' Affairs and Immunities Committee

•	Member of the delegation to the Central European Initiative

References

External links
Arkadiusz Mularczyk - parliamentary page - includes declarations of interest, voting record, and transcripts of speeches.
Facebook https://www.facebook.com/arkadiusz.mularczyk
Twitter https://twitter.com/arekmularczyk?ref_src=twsrc%5Egoogle%7Ctwcamp%5Eserp%7Ctwgr%5Eauthor

1971 births
Living people
People from Racibórz
Law and Justice politicians
Members of the Polish Sejm 2005–2007
Members of the Polish Sejm 2007–2011
Members of the Polish Sejm 2011–2015
Members of the Polish Sejm 2015–2019
Members of the Polish Sejm 2019–2023